Digg, stylized in lowercase as digg, is an American news aggregator with a curated front page, aiming to select stories specifically for the Internet audience such as science, trending political issues, and viral Internet issues. It was launched in its current form on July 31, 2012, with support for sharing content to other social platforms such as Twitter and Facebook.

It formerly had been a popular social news website, allowing people to vote web content up or down, called digging and burying, respectively. In 2012, Quantcast estimated Digg's monthly U.S. unique visits at 3.8 million. Digg's popularity prompted the creation of similar sites such as Reddit.

In July 2008, the former company took part in advanced acquisition talks with Google for a reported $200 million price tag, but the deal ultimately fell through. After a controversial 2010 redesign and the departure of co-founders Jay Adelson and Kevin Rose, in July 2012 Digg was sold in three parts: the Digg brand, website, and technology were sold to Betaworks for an estimated $500,000; 15 staff were transferred to The Washington Posts "SocialCode" for a reported $12 million; and a suite of patents was sold to LinkedIn for about $4 million.

Digg was purchased by BuySellAds, an advertising company, for an undisclosed amount in April 2018.

History

Digg started as an experiment in November 2004 by collaborators Kevin Rose, Owen Byrne, Ron Gorodetzky, and Jay Adelson. The original design by Dan Ries was free of advertisements. The company added Google AdSense early in the project but switched to MSN adCenter in 2007.

The site's main function was to let users discover, share and recommend web content. Members of the community could submit a webpage for general consideration. Other members could vote that page up ("digg") or down ("bury"). Although voting took place on digg.com, many websites added "digg" buttons to their pages, allowing users to vote as they browsed the web. The end product was a series of wide-ranging, constantly updated lists of popular and trending content from around the Internet, aggregated by a social network.

Additions and improvements were made throughout the website's first years. Digg v2 was released in July 2005, with a new interface by web design company silverorange. New features included a friends list, and the ability to "digg" a story without being redirected to a success page. One year later, as part of Digg v3, the website added specific categories for technology, science, world and business, videos, entertainment, and gaming, as well as a "view all" section that merged all categories. Further interface adjustments were made in August 2007.

By 2008, Digg's homepage was attracting over 236 million visitors annually, according to a Compete.com survey. Digg had grown large enough that it was thought to affect the traffic of submitted web pages. Some pages experienced a sudden increase in traffic shortly after being submitted; some Digg users refer to this as the "Digg effect".

Redesign
CEO Jay Adelson announced in 2010 that the site would undergo an extensive overhaul. In an interview with Wired magazine, Adelson stated that "Every single thing has changed" and that "the entire website has been rewritten." The company switched from MySQL to Cassandra, a distributed database system; in a blog post, VP Engineering John Quinn described the move as "bold". Adelson summed up the new Digg by saying, "We've got a new backend, a new infrastructure layer, a new services layer, new machines—everything."

Adelson stepped down as CEO on April 5, 2010, to explore entrepreneurial opportunities, months before the launch date of Digg v4. He had been the company's CEO since its inception. Kevin Rose, another original founder, stepped in temporarily as CEO and Chairman.

Digg's v4 release on August 25, 2010, was marred by site-wide bugs and glitches. Digg users reacted with hostile verbal opposition. Beyond the release, Digg faced problems due to so-called "power users" who would manipulate the article recommendation features to only support one another's postings, flooding the site with articles only from these users and making it impossible to have genuine content from non-power users appear on the front page. Frustrations with the system led to dwindling web traffic, exacerbated by heavy competition from Facebook, whose like buttons started to appear on websites next to Digg's. High staff turnover included the departure of head of business development Matt Van Horn, shortly after v4's release.

On September 1, 2010, Matt Williams took over as CEO, ending Rose's troubled tenure as interim chief executive.

In 2013, Andrew McLaughlin took over as CEO after Digg was sold to BetaWorks and re-launched.

In 2015, Gary Liu took over as Digg CEO.

In 2016, Joshua Auerbach took over as interim CEO.

In September 2016, Digg announced that it would begin a data partnership with Gannett. The "seven figure" investment would give Gannett access to real-time trend analysis of Digg's 7.5 million pieces of content.

In 2017, Michael O'Connor took over as CEO, and continues as CEO today.

Sale and relaunch
In July 2012, Digg was sold in three parts: the Digg brand, website, and technology were sold to Betaworks for $500,000; 15 staff were transferred to The Washington Posts SocialCode project for $12 million, and a suite of patents was sold to LinkedIn for around $4 million.

There are reports that Digg had been trying to sell itself to a larger company since early 2006. The most notable attempt took place in July 2008, when Google entered talks to buy Digg for around $200 million. Google walked away from negotiations during the deal's due diligence phase, informing Digg on July 25 that it was no longer interested in the purchase. Digg subsequently went into further venture capital funding, receiving $28.7 million from investors such as Highland Capital Partners to move headquarters and add staff. Several months later, CEO Jay Adelson said Digg was no longer for sale.

On July 20, 2012, new owners Betaworks announced via Twitter that they were rebuilding Digg from scratch, "turning [Digg] back into a start-up". Betaworks gave the project a six-week deadline. Surveys of existing users, through the website ReThinkDigg.com, were used to inform the development of a new user interface and user experience.

Digg tried rebooting itself by resetting its version number and launching Digg v1 a day early on July 31, 2012. It featured an editorially driven front page, more images, and top, popular and upcoming stories. Users could access a new scoring system. There was increased support for sharing content to other social platforms such as Twitter and Facebook. Digg's front page content is selected by editors, instead of users on other communities like Reddit.

In March 2018, Digg announced that it would shut down its RSS reader, Digg Reader.

Until its sale to BuySellAds.com in 2018, its offices were located at 50 Eldridge Street in New York City's Chinatown.

Features

Digg Reader 

In response to the announced shutdown of Google Reader, Digg announced on March 14, 2013 that it was working on its own RSS reader.  Digg Reader launched on June 28, 2013 as a web and iOS application. An Android app was released on August 29, 2013. Digg announced that it would shut down Digg Reader on March 26, 2018.

Issues relating to former Digg website

Organized promotion and censorship by users 

It was possible for users to have disproportionate influence on Digg, either by themselves or in teams. These users were sometimes motivated to promote or bury pages for political or financial reasons.

Serious attempts by users to game the site began in 2006. A top user was banned after agreeing to promote a story for cash to an undercover Digg sting operation. Another group of users openly formed a 'Bury Brigade' to remove "spam" articles about US politician Ron Paul; critics accused the group of attempting to stifle any mention of Ron Paul on Digg.

Digg hired computer scientist Anton Kast to develop a diversity algorithm that would prevent special interest groups from dominating Digg. During a town hall meeting, Digg executives responded to criticism by removing some features that gave superusers extra weight, but declined to make "buries" transparent.

However, later that year Google increased its page rank for Digg. Shortly afterwards, many 'pay for Diggs' startups were created to profit from the opportunity. According to TechCrunch, one top user charged $700 per story, with a $500 bonus if the story reached the front page.

Digg Patriots was a conservative Yahoo! Groups mailing list, with an associated page on coRank, accused of coordinated, politically motivated behavior on Digg. Progressive blogger Ole Ole Olson wrote in August 2010 that Digg Patriots undertook a year-long effort of organized burying of seemingly liberal articles from Digg's Upcoming module. He also accused leading members of vexatiously reporting liberal users for banning (and those who seemed liberal), and creating "sleeper" accounts in the event of administrators banning their accounts. These and other actions would violate Digg's terms of usage. Olson's post was immediately followed by the disbanding and closure of the DiggPatriots list, and an investigation into the matter by Digg.

AACS encryption key controversy 

On May 1, 2007, an article appeared on Digg's homepage that contained the encryption key for the AACS digital rights management protection of HD DVD and Blu-ray Disc. Then Digg, "acting on the advice of its lawyers", removed posting submissions about the secret number from its database and banned several users for submitting it. The removals were seen by many Digg users as a capitulation to corporate interests and an assault on free speech. A statement by Jay Adelson attributed the article's take-down to an attempt to comply with cease and desist letters from the Advanced Access Content System consortium and cited Digg's Terms of Use as justification for taking down the article. Although some users defended Digg's actions, as a whole the community staged a widespread revolt with numerous articles and comments made using the encryption key. The scope of the user response was so great that one of the Digg users referred to it as a "digital Boston Tea Party". The response was also directly responsible for Digg reversing the policy and stating: "But now, after seeing hundreds of stories and reading thousands of comments, you've made it clear. You'd rather see Digg go down fighting than bow down to a bigger company. We hear you, and effective immediately we won't delete stories or comments containing the code and will deal with whatever the consequences might be."

Digg v4 
Digg's version 4 release was initially unstable. The site was unreachable or unstable for weeks after its launch on August 25, 2010. Many users, upon finally reaching the site, complained about the new design and the removal of many features (such as bury, favorites, friends submissions, upcoming pages, subcategories, videos and history search). Kevin Rose replied to complaints on his blog, promising to fix the algorithm and restore some features.

Alexis Ohanian, founder of rival site Reddit, said in an open letter to Rose:

Disgruntled users declared a "quit Digg day" on August 30, 2010, and used Digg's own auto-submit feature to fill the front page with content from Reddit. Reddit also temporarily added the Digg shovel to their logo to welcome fleeing Digg users.

Digg's traffic dropped significantly after the launch of version 4, and publishers reported a drop in direct referrals from stories on Digg's front page. New CEO Matt Williams attempted to address some of the users' concerns in a blog post on October 12, 2010, promising to reinstate many of the features that had been removed.

Timeline

See also 

 Delicious
 diggnation
 Facebook
 Fark
 Mixx
 Propeller.com
 Reddit
 Slashdot
 Social bookmarking
 StumbleUpon
 Virato Social News
 Web 2.0
 Wykop.pl

References

External links 

 

News aggregators
American news websites
Social bookmarking websites
Internet properties established in 2004
Social information processing
2004 establishments in California
Companies based in New York City
Censored works
Social software
Shorty Award winners